Antonio Lowe (born 9 June 1986) is a Bermudian international footballer who plays for Dandy Town Hornets.

Club career
He played college soccer for CBU Capers as a defender, joining compatriots Jason Davis and Jacqui Simons.

International career
He made his debut for Bermuda in a December 2007 friendly match against St Kitts & Nevis and earned a total of 8 caps, scoring no goals. He has represented his country in 3 FIFA World Cup qualification matches.

His final international match was an August 2008 CONCACAF Gold Cup qualification match against the Cayman Islands.

References

External links

Caribbean Football Database

1986 births
Living people
Association football fullbacks
Bermudian footballers
Bermuda international footballers
Dandy Town Hornets F.C. players